Lee Dong-min (born March 30, 1997), known professionally as Cha Eun-woo, is a South Korean singer, actor, and model under the label Fantagio. He is a member of the South Korean boy band Astro.

Early life 
Cha Eun-woo was born on March 30, 1997, in the city of Gunpo, Gyeonggi Province. He attended Suri Middle School and Suri High School before graduating from Hanlim Multi Art School in 2016. He studied at Sungkyunkwan University, majoring in performing arts.

Career

2013–2015: Career beginnings 
Cha debuted as an actor with a minor role in the film My Brilliant Life. He was the fourth trainee to be officially introduced with the Fantagio iTeen Photo Test Cut. In August 2015, Cha, along with the other members of Astro, participated in the web-drama To Be Continued.

2016–present: Debut with Astro, solo activities and rising popularity 

Astro debuted on February 23, 2016, with the EP Spring Up. In August, Cha participated in the Chuseok special variety show, Replies That Make Us Flutter. In September, he participated in another Chuseok pilot program, Boomshakalaka.

Cha was announced as a host of Show! Music Core alongside Kim Sae-ron, Lee Soo-min and Xiyeon from 2016 to 2018. In 2016, he also starred in the web drama My Romantic Some Recipe.

In 2017, Cha was cast in the KBS2 drama Hit the Top and starred in the web drama Sweet Revenge.

In 2018, Cha starred in the web drama Top Management. He was later cast in the JTBC romantic comedy series Gangnam Beauty, his first leading role on television. He saw a rise in popularity after the series aired and was included in GQ Korea's "Men of the Year".

In 2019, Cha starred in the historical drama Rookie Historian Goo Hae-ryung alongside Shin Se-kyung. He played the role of an royal price who became a romance novelist, and won the Excellence Award for an Actor and Best Couple Award with Shin at the MBC Drama Awards. In December, he was announced as a cast member of the new variety show Handsome Tigers alongside Joy, Lee Sang-yoon, Yoo Seon-ho, and Seo Jang-hoon. 

In April 2020, Cha joined SBS television show Master in the House as a fixed cast member. At the 2020 SBS Entertainment Awards, he won the Rookie Award for his role on the show. In December 2020, he starred in the tvN coming-of-age romance drama True Beauty based on the webtoon of the same name, playing high school student alongside Moon Ga-young. 

In June 2021, he left Master in the House. In November 2021, Cha released "Don't Cry, My Love", a ballad song featuring a piano performance, for the official soundtrack of the comic Under The Oak Tree.

In 2022, Cha recorded "Focus on Me" for the soundtrack of the Kakao webtoon The Villainess Is a Marionette, released on February 22. He then played the role of a Navy officer in Hwang In-ho's urban terror action film Decibel which was released in November 2022. Later that year he starred in TVING drama Island alongside Kim Nam-gil, Lee Da-hee and Sung Joon, playing the role of an exorcist priest.  On December 30, Fantagio released an official statement and stated that Cha had decided to renew his contract with the agency.

In 2023, Cha is set to star in the webtoon-based fantasy romance drama drama A Good Day to Be a Dog.

Other ventures

Endorsements 
In February 2021, Cha became Penshoppe's international ambassador. In March, he was selected as the brand model for Noona Holdak Chicken. In May, Cha was chosen as a new model for clothing brand O'Neill. In July, Cha became a brand ambassador for Burberry. Cha was then chosen as Konvy's first presenter, as well as a model for Mackiss Company's Now We Are soju and the health functional food "perilla in the eyes". In August, Cha was selected as a model for Samhwa Foods, and the new muse of Dashu Perfume.

In January 2022, Cha became the muse for the hair styling brand Dashu. The next two months, he became as a new brand ambassador for Ms Glow, and Mister Potato. In April 2022, Cha modeled for contemporary men's clothing brand Liberclassy. In June, Cha became a brand ambassador for Dior Beauty, announced after attending Jean-Michel Othoniel's exhibition. In December, there was a post announcing Cha became a brand ambassador for Dior.

In January 2023, Cha became a regional brand ambassador for Skechers, this partnership covers seven key Asia-Pacific markets for Skechers: Singapore, Hong Kong, Macau, Malaysia, Philippines, Thailand and Vietnam.   Dior Beauty post announcing welcome Cha as the first global ambassador for Dior Capture Totale the new Serum. In February, Cha and actress Han So-hee were selected as CF models together for global clothing brand Giordano.  Cha launches the global campaign 2023 NEW Liens collection Liens Evidence, featuring a bridge that connects two people who express different emotions. that can be experienced in important moments of life With Chaumet's unique artistic sense. In March, Cha became a brand ambassador for Est Cola.

Philanthropy
In April 2019, Cha donated  million to help support the victims of the Sokcho Fire. In February 2020, It was revealed that Cha had donated  million to help those affected by COVID-19 pandemic in South Korea.

In June 2022, Cha participated as a special audio guide for the art exhibit of Sir Michael Craig-Martin & even donated some proceeds for cancer patients at the national cancer center. In November 2022, it was announced that Cha will hold a photo exhibition at the end of the year and will donate all profits to help the underprivileged.

Impact and influence
In November 2018, Cha was included as one of GQ Korea's Men of the Year. In 2019, he ranked seventh—with 44,178,474 points—in the Most Accumulated Points On Male Idol Brand Reputation. In the K-pop Radar Year-End Chart of 2019, Cha was named as the male "Hot Instagrammer".

In April 2021, Cha placed 17th on Forbes Korea Power Celebrity and sixth in the SNS category. In April 2022, after Cha was selected to represent contemporary men's clothing brand Liberclassy, traffic to the company's mall increased by 806% in the first week of April from the previous week, and the brand also saw an increase in social media engagement. An official from Liberclassy said, "The Cha Eunwoo effect was seen as more than 70 million won in sales generated for pre-application alone".

In January 2023, Cha was the Top Male Influencer in Fashion in 2022, and the only male to make it into the Top 10 influencers with $82.5 Million EMV, as reported by Lefty.

Discography

Songwriting credits 
All credits are listed under the Korea Music Copyright Association unless otherwise stated.

Filmography

Film

Television series

Web series

Television show

Web shows

Hosting

Awards and nominations

Listicles

Notes

References

External links

 Cha Eun-Woo on Fantagio
Cha Eun-woo on IMDb
Cha Eun-woo at HanCinema

1997 births
Living people
Astro (South Korean band) members
South Korean male idols
People from Gunpo
Fantagio artists
South Korean male television actors
South Korean male models
K-pop singers
21st-century South Korean male singers
21st-century South Korean male actors
Hanlim Multi Art School alumni